Wincrange is a commune and village in northern Luxembourg, in the canton of Clervaux. The commune is the largest in Luxembourg by geographic area.

Wincrange was formed on 1 January 1978 from the former communes of Asselborn, Boevange, Hachiville, and Oberwampach, all in Clervaux canton.  The law creating Wincrange was passed on 31 October 1977.

, the village of Wincrange, which lies in the centre of the commune, has a population of 232.

Populated places
The commune consists of the following villages:

 Asselborn Section:
 Asselborn
 Boxhorn
 Maulusmühle
 Rumlange
 Sassel
 Stockem
 Uschler
 Lentzweilera
 Asselborn-Moulin (lieu-dit)
 Emeschbach-Asselborn (lieu-dit)
 Emeschbach-Stockem (lieu-dit)
 Bockmühle (lieu-dit)
 Cinqfontaines (lieu-dit)
 Asselborn-Route (lieu-dit)
 Stockem-Route (lieu-dit)

 Boevange Section:
 Boevange
 Deiffelt
 Doennange
 Hamiville
 Crendal
 Lullange
 Troine
 Wincrange
 Lentzweilerb
 Hinterhasselt (lieu-dit)
 Antoniushof (lieu-dit)
 Troine-Route (lieu-dit)

 Hachiville Section:
 Hachiville
 Hoffelt
 Weiler
 Neumühle
 Lehresmühle
 Moulin-Neuf (lieu-dit)

 Oberwampach Section:
 Allerborn
 Brachtenbach
 Derenbach
 Niederwampach
 Schimpach
 Oberwampach
 Birkenhof (lieu-dit)
 Buschweg (lieu-dit)
 Schimpach-Station (lieu-dit)

Notes:
a - partly shared with the former commune of Boevange
b - partly shared with the former commune of Asselborn

Population

References

External links
 

 
Communes in Clervaux (canton)
Villages in Luxembourg
1978 in Luxembourg